Cedrorum azoricus is a species of beetle in the family Carabidae, the only species in the genus Cedrorum. It is native to the Azores archipelago.

References

Pterostichinae
Endemic arthropods of the Azores

Beetles described in 1993